John Symme, of Canterbury, Kent (c. 1333 – after 1393), was an English politician and weaver.

Symme was a Member of Parliament for Canterbury constituency in April 1384 and 1386. Symme married, before 1381, a woman named Christine. He was bailiff of the city of Canterbury in 1392.

References

1333 births
Year of death missing
English MPs April 1384
People from Canterbury
English MPs 1386